The 1876 United States presidential election in Pennsylvania took place on November 7, 1876, as part of the 1876 United States presidential election. Voters chose 29 representatives, or electors to the Electoral College, who voted for president and vice president.

Pennsylvania voted for the Republican nominee, Rutherford B. Hayes, over the Democratic nominee, Samuel J. Tilden. Hayes won Pennsylvania by a narrow margin of 2.37%.

Results

See also
 List of United States presidential elections in Pennsylvania

References

Pennsylvania
1876
1876 Pennsylvania elections